Allan Murray de San Miguel (born 1 February 1988) is an Australian former professional baseball catcher. He is currently a coach with the Kansas City Royals. De San Miguel was previously a manager for the Melbourne Aces of the Australian Baseball League following a long career with the Australian national baseball team, both the Perth Heat and Melbourne Aces in the Australian Baseball League and various minor league baseball teams.

De San Miguel is the most capped player in the Australian Baseball League, holding the record for the most games played with 386 when he retired following the 2019–20 Australian Baseball League season.

Playing career
De San Miguel attended South Fremantle Senior High School in Perth, Western Australia before signing with the Minnesota Twins organization as an undrafted free agent on August 18, 2004. He split time between all levels of the Twins organization, from Rookie League to AAA, as an organizational catcher until the Twins released him from the New Britain Rock Cats in 2011.

On January 9, 2012, de San Miguel signed a minor league contract with the Baltimore Orioles following a strong showing in the ABL. He split time between the A+ Frederick Keys, AA Bowie Baysox, and AAA Norfolk Tides, batting .239/.331/.399 and 6HRs in 63 games. He was invited to Spring Training with the Orioles in 2013, and spent the entire season in A+ Frederick, batting .240/.366/.421 with 10HRs in 65 games. He elected free agency on November 4, 2013. On January 13, 2014, de San Miguel signed a minor league contract with the Colorado Rockies. He was released before the season started on March 27, 2014. He spent the 2014 season as the starting catcher for the Southern Maryland Blue Crabs of the independent Atlantic League of Professional Baseball. He batted .203/.289/.332 with 5HR in 61 games for the Blue Crabs.

On January 12, 2015, de San Miguel returned to the Twins organization, but appeared in only 3 games for Rochester, the Twins' AAA affiliate before suffering an injury. He elected free agency on November 6, 2015. On February 11, 2016, de San Miguel signed a minor league contract with the Kansas City Royals, batting .187/.248/.264 in 30 games between AAA Omaha and AA Northwest Arkansas. The following year he hit .237/.310/.333 in 34 games. In 2018 and 2019, he was still signed as a player with the Royals, but rarely activated as a player on the phantom injured list. He made no appearances in either season before electing free agency on November 4, 2019.

On January 10, 2020, de San Miguel signed a new minor league deal with the Kansas City Royals and was assigned to the Northwest Arkansas Naturals. On July 4, de San Miguel was added to the 60-man player pool. On November 2, 2020, de San Miguel elected free agency. On February 3, 2021, de San Miguel re-signed with the Royals on a minor league contract.

Australian Baseball League
De San Miguel was the starting catcher for the Perth Heat of the Australian Baseball League for six seasons from 2010 through 2015. In 2016, he joined the Melbourne Aces. He is a career .270/.382/.452 hitter with 39HRs in 279 games in the ABL. He is a four-time ABL Champion with the Heat, who won in 2010-11, 2011–12, 2013–14, 2014–15, and with the Melbourne Aces in 2019-20 and 2020-21 as a manager. de San Miguel was named MVP of the 2014-15 Championship Series.

Records that belong to de San Miguel following his retirement in the 2019–20 Australian Baseball League season include games (386), plate appearances (1560), at-bats (1300), runs batted in (214), hit by pitch (39), as well as strikeouts (294), and grounded into double play (42).

During the 2022–23 Australian Baseball League season, Tim Kennelly (baseball) broke his plate appearance, at-bats and RBI records.

Australian national team
In 2009, he was a provisional member of the Australia national baseball team at the 2009 World Baseball Classic. Australia was eliminated in the first round of the tournament and placed 12th of 16 teams with a record of 1-2. De San Miguel did not play in the tournament.

In 2013, he returned with the team for the 2013 World Baseball Classic, for which Australia automatically qualified. Australia finished in last place out of sixteen teams, having lost three games in the first round to Chinese Taipei, South Korea, and the Netherlands. De San Miguel went 0-for-3 with a strikeout against Korea, and replaced Matt Kennelly late in the game against the Netherlands, striking out in his only appearance.

In 2016, de San Miguel caught for Australia in the 2017 World Baseball Classic – Qualifier 1, which occurred February 11–14, 2016. Australia defeated the Philippines and South Africa twice to advance in the tournament. He appeared in all three games, going 2-for-11 with a walk and a strikeout.

De San Miguel returned in 2017 to compete in the World Baseball Classic with the Australia national baseball team. Australia was eliminated in the first round, losing to both Japan and Cuba. De San Miguel had a strong series, going 5-for-9 with one walk and three strikeouts. He hit a solo home run off of Tomoyuki Sugano in the second inning of the first game against Japan.

In 2018, he was selected exhibition series against Japan.

On October 8, 2019, he was selected at the 2019 WBSC Premier12.

Coaching career
The Royals announced that they hired de San Miguel to their major league coaching staff as a strategist and bullpen catcher before the 2022 season.

References

External links

1988 births
Living people
Australian expatriate baseball players in the United States
Bowie Baysox players
Baseball catchers
Baseball people from Western Australia
Beloit Snappers players
Fort Myers Miracle players
Frederick Keys players
Gulf Coast Twins players
Melbourne Aces players
New Britain Rock Cats players
Norfolk Tides players
Northwest Arkansas Naturals players
Omaha Storm Chasers players
Perth Heat players
Rochester Red Wings players
Southern Maryland Blue Crabs players
Sportspeople from Perth, Western Australia
2013 World Baseball Classic players
2017 World Baseball Classic players